Carl Martin is an American politician who represents District 45 in the West Virginia House of Delegates as a Republican.

References

See also 

Living people
Year of birth missing (living people)
21st-century American politicians
Republican Party members of the West Virginia House of Delegates
Place of birth missing (living people)